Daughter of the Tong is a 1939 crime film about a detective that goes against a female leader of an Oriental crime ring.

Plot
Ralph Dickson is an FBI agent assigned to investigate the killing of a colleague.  He is chosen to investigate due to an uncanny likeness to the presumed killer.  Dickson goes undercover and learns the identity of the gang leader, Carney, who is also known as "the Illustrious One" and the "Daughter of the Tong." Carney stays holed up at the Oriental Hotel while she has her henchmen doing her dirty work.

Cast
Evelyn Brent as Carney - The Illustrious One
Grant Withers as Ralph Dickson
Dorothy Short as Marion Morgan
Dave O'Brien as Jerry Morgan
Richard Loo as Wong, the hotel clerk
Dirk Thane as Henchman Ward
Harry Harvey as Harold 'Mugsy' Winthrop
Budd Buster as 'Lefty' McMillan
Robert Frazer as FBI Chief Williams
Hal Taliaferro as FBI Agent Lawson

Distributors
Times Exchange (1939) (USA) (theatrical)
Reel Media International (2004) (worldwide) (VHS)
Alpha Video Distributors (June 28, 2005) (USA) (DVD)
Mill Creek Entertainment (2007) (USA) (DVD)
Reel Media International (2007) (non-USA) (all media)

References

External links
 
 
 
 
 

1939 films
1939 crime films
American black-and-white films
American crime films
Films directed by Raymond K. Johnson
Films with screenplays by George H. Plympton
1930s English-language films
1930s American films